is a Roman Catholic church located in Port-aux-Français, the capital settlement of the Kerguelen Islands, Territory of the French Southern and Antarctic Lands in the south Indian Ocean.

The chapel was built during the 1950s and is made out of concrete. Small rectangular stained glass adorn the base of the ceiling. Its proportions are based on the Golden Ratio. A few celebrations are held through the year.
 
A statue of the Virgin and Child is located between the chapel and the Golfe du Morbihan (Kerguelen). It is the southernmost French Catholic place of worship.

External links

 16 Pictures of the chapel from a personal website (in French)

Roman Catholic chapels in Antarctica
Kerguelen Islands
Churches completed in the 1950s
1950s establishments in Antarctica